Henry George Tyrell-Smith (1907–1982) was an Irish motorcycle road racer. He was born in Co Dublin and studied at Trinity College, Dublin for a B.A. And B.A.I.degree. He raced at the Isle of Man TT from 1927 to 1939, and between 1929 and 1936 competed in the German Grand Prix. He also raced in The Swedish Grand Prix in Saxtorp 1933–36.

Background
Henry's first motorcycle was an ex War Department Douglas. From 1924 to 1929 he studied for engineering degree at Trinity College Dublin. From 1936 to 1939 he worked for the Experimental Department at Excelsior motorcycles. From 1939 to 1942 he was with the Bristol Aeroplane Co working on single-cylinder test stands. In 1942 he received a direct officer commission for REME. He was with the Workshop Office for Guards Armoured Division during D-Day landings and Normandy. In 1945 he was promoted to major as a workshop control officer in an engine repair shop at Volkswagen in Wolfsburg. After the war he worked in the Experimental Department for Triumph Motorcycles.

Motorcycle racing career 
Tyrell-Smith started out on a Douglas, and finished second in the 1926 Leinster 200. He rode a Triumph in the 1927 Isle of Man TT, and by the next year rode for Rudge, and continued to do so until 1935.

In the 1929 IOM Senior TT Tyrell-Smith began in the lead, and by the fourth lap was more than three minutes ahead. Then he crashed at Glen Helen, allowing a number of bikes to pass before he could rejoin, and this put Tim Hunt, on a Norton, in front. When Hunt had problems, Sunbeam's Charlie Dodson moved into the lead. Interest then began to focus on Tyrell-Smith, who, riding furiously, was making up time on the leaders. Dodson won, with his teammate Alec Bennett more than four minutes behind, and Tyrell-Smith only 50 seconds behind him, taking third. When he was examined after the race, it was found that he had leg injuries and three cracked ribs. The Rudge team of those years consisted of competition manager Graham Walker, with Ernie Nott, and H.G. Tyrell Smith.

Tyrell-Smith won the 1930 500cc European Championship for Rudge. In 1933 he rode an OK-Supreme in the Lightweight. In 1934 he rode an AJS in the Senior, and the 1935 Junior, having his last TT ride for Rudge in the 1935 Senior. From 1936 to 1939 he rode for Excelsior. The bike Tyrell-Smith rode in the 1936 Lightweight was a four-valve OHC radial head Excelsior with two carburettors. He finished second and went on to win the 250 cc European Championship. In the late 1930s he worked for Excelsior motorcycle company and when the war broke out, joined the British Army and served in the D-Day landings with the Royal Electrical and Mechanical Engineers (REME). After the war, a career followed with Girling Ltd as sales engineer supplying suspension units to the British Motorcycle industry

In the 1960s he was regularly seen at the Isle of Man TT races accompanying the Girling racing department in his capacity as representative to the motorcycle industry but also helping to provide the support to the sport that he loved. "Tyrell" took retirement in 1972. On 30 September 1956 the first Coventry Parade – then known as the Coventry–Birmingham–Coventry Veteran Motorcycle Run – was held. There were 61 entries,
including "H.G. Tyrrell (sic.) Smith, successful TT rider of the 20s and 30s"

Isle of Man TT Race career

 DNF in 1931 Junior and Senior.
 DNF in 1936 Junior (Excelsior)- Retired Lap 3 at Creg-ny-Baa.
 DNF in 1937 Lightweight(Excelsior) – Retired Lap 6 at Creg-ny-Baa with broken connecting-rod.
 DNF in 1939 Senior.

German Motorcycle GP
 In 1929 Henry Tyrell-Smith won the 500 cc class at the German motorcycle Grand Prix
 In 1931 the 350 cc Grand Prix
 In 1934 the 250 cc Grand Prix
 In 1936 the 250 cc Grand Prix

Other race wins
1931
250cc Dutch Grand Prix
1932
350cc Ulster Grand Prix – Rudge 77.89 mph
350cc Brooklands Grand Prix
1933
500cc Leinster 200
1934
250cc Belgium Grand Prix
1936
350cc Dublin 100
1937
350cc Dublin 100
250cc Leinster 200
1938
250cc North West 200

References

External links
 race results
 Isle of Man TT winners
 Mountain Course map
 https://web.archive.org/web/20071202065211/http://www.reisemosaik.at/Oldtimer/Krackowizer_Motorcycles_M_R.htm
 Saxtorp Grand Prix
 Henry Tyrell-Smith's rootsweb profile

1907 births
1982 deaths
Irish motorcycle racers
Isle of Man TT riders
Royal Electrical and Mechanical Engineers officers
Sportspeople from County Dublin
British Army personnel of World War II
Alumni of Trinity College Dublin